Kalateh Absardeh (also Romanized as Kalāteh Ābsardeh; also known as Ābsardeh, Āb-e Sard, and Āb-ī-Sārd) is a village in Hemmatabad Rural District, in the Central District of Borujerd County, Lorestan Province, Iran. At the 2006 census, its population was 122, in 30 families.

References 

Towns and villages in Borujerd County